Trenches is an American science fiction web series directed and produced by Shane Felux, creator of Star Wars: Revelations.  The show premiered on Crackle on February 16, 2010.  The show was written by Dawn Cowings and Sarah Yaworsky, and Aaron Mathias, Mercy Malick, Lev Gorn, Hong Chau, Daz Crawford, and Scott Nankivel star. New episodes were streamed on Monday, Wednesday, and Friday through March 5, 2010. Trenches was originally produced in 2007 for Disney's Stage 9, a web video venture company, but has since been licensed to Crackle.

Plot
Locked in a grueling war on a backwater planet, two enemies find themselves abandoned by their own. They must put aside their differences and work together if they are to survive.  They better do it quickly - they are not alone on this rock.

Cast
Aaron Mathias as Lt. Andrews
Mercy Malick as Cpt. Racine
Lev Gorn as Cpl. Traina
Hong Chau as Spc. Wing
Daz Crawford as Sgt. Verro
Scott Nankivel as Pfc. Janeski

References 

2009 web series debuts
2010 web series endings
American science fiction web series
Crackle (streaming service) original programming